Blackiston may refer to:

Blackiston, Delaware, an unincorporated community in Kent County, Delaware, United States
Blackiston Formation, a geologic formation in Indiana, United States

People with the surname
Galton Blackiston, English chef

See also
Blackiston Mill, Indiana, an unincorporated community in Floyd County, Indiana, United States